Cooking with the Stars is a 2012 Philippine television cooking show broadcast by GMA Network. Hosted by Grace Lee, it premiered on May 28, 2012. The show concluded on August 4, 2012 with a total of 30 episodes.

Overview
The show showcases easy-to-prepare dishes, as well as tips on preparing foods and tackles other food-related dilemmas. The host will be accompanied by top chefs: Chef Maricel Manalo who will focus on kid-friendly meals; Chef Martin del Prado who will focus on teaching how to cook foods fit for one's barkada (group of friends); Chef Rene Cruz specializes viands for a fiesta; and Chef Kai Verdadero will focus on recipes for delicious and healthy foods.

Every episode, the show will feature a celebrity who has a food-related dilemma and at the end of the program, the resident chefs will offer solutions on how to solve the problem.

The show also has segment like Cooking Star of the Barangay, where the show will visit barangays bringing with them a live brass band and dancing food servers.

Ratings
According to AGB Nielsen Philippines' Mega Manila household television ratings, the pilot episode of Cooking with the Stars earned an 8.3% rating. While the final episode scored a 10.2% rating.

References

External links
 

2012 Philippine television series debuts
2012 Philippine television series endings
Filipino-language television shows
GMA Network original programming
Philippine cooking television series